Tad Danielewski (March 29, 1921 – January 6, 1993) was a Polish-born American film director.

Early years
Born as Tadeusz Zbigniew Danielewski in Radom, Poland, he served in the Polish Underground during World War II but was captured and interred in a Nazi work camp until rescued by Patton's forces. He and his wife, actress Sylvia Daneel (née Sylwia Jadwiga Łakomska), emigrated to the United States in 1948. They formalized their union in the United States with a civil ceremony in Los Angeles, California on June 9, 1950, and shortly after began studying at the University of Iowa. They were naturalized as United States citizens on April 19, 1954 through a Special Act of Congress. The couple later divorced.

Career
After the war, he studied at the Royal Academy of Dramatic Art in London and started the Professional Actors Workshop in New York City, whose students included Martin Sheen, James Earl Jones, and Mercedes Ruehl. He was president of Stratton Productions, Inc. (NYC), a firm engaged in stage, film and TV productions.

He worked at NBC as a studio supervisor and helped develop a new method for directing TV programs. In 1983, he provided the Polish translation of "Sweet Georgia Brown" for Mel Brooks's 1983 adaptation of To Be or Not to Be. He worked at the Brigham Young University Department of Theatre and Cinematic Arts from 1975–89. He moved to head up the USC drama department in Los Angeles until his death in 1993.

Personal life
Danielewski was married three times. First to actress Sylvia Daneel (née Sylvia Jadwiga Łakomska; born June 20, 1927), with whom he had a son, Christopher Danielewski. Second to Priscilla Decatur Machold (later Mrs. Loeb), with whom he had two children: the musician Poe (Anne Danielewski), and the novelist Mark Z. Danielewski, of House of Leaves fame. Third to Lillian Danielewski; that union was childless and ended with Tad Danielewski's death.

Death
Danielewski died of cancer in 1993 in Los Angeles, California, aged 71. He was survived by his widow, Lillian, as well as his former wives, and his three children from his first two marriages.

Filmography
1961: The Big Wave
1962: No Exit
1965: Guide
1972: España puerta abierta

External links
 
 Tad Danielewski at the University of Wisconsin's Actors Studio audio collection; accessed August 11, 2014
 The New York Times, January 13, 1993
 Article in the Los Angeles Times, January 13, 1993

References

1921 births
1993 deaths
Actors Studio alumni
American film directors
Brigham Young University faculty
Deaths from cancer in California
People from Radom
Polish emigrants to the United States
Polish film directors
University of Iowa alumni